Loknya may refer to several places in Russia:

Rivers
Loknya (river), in Pskov Oblast

Urban localities
Loknya, Pskov Oblast, a work settlement in Loknyansky District of Pskov Oblast

Rural localities
Loknya, Belgorod Oblast, a selo in Yakovlevsky District of Belgorod Oblast
Loknya, Bryansk Oblast, a village in Krasnorogsky Selsoviet of Pochepsky District of Bryansk Oblast
Loknya, Kursk Oblast, a settlement in Lebedevsky Selsoviet of Sudzhansky District of Kursk Oblast
Loknya, Ryazan Oblast, a village in Slobodskoy Rural Okrug of Mikhaylovsky District of Ryazan Oblast